Vrubel is a Russian-language  surname, a transcription of the Polish surname Wróbel into Russian. Notable people with the surname include:

 Dmitri Vrubel (1960–2022), Russian painter
 Mikhail Vrubel (1856–1910), Russian painter
 Nadezhda Zabela-Vrubel (1868–1913), Ukrainian-born Russian opera singer, wife of Mikhail Vrubel

See also
 
 Wrubel

Polish-language surnames
Russian-language surnames